The Westshore Enforcement Bureau (WEB) is headquartered in Bay Village, Ohio. It was established in 1970. The organization provides services for high-risk arrest warrants, search warrants, barricaded suspects, and hostage rescues. It also seems to be involved in drug-enforcement.

The group does not maintain a presence on the Internet. 

Member agencies of the group are: 

Fairview Police Department
North Olmsted Police Department
Lakewood Police Department
North Olmsted Police Department
Westlake Police Department

References

Law enforcement in Ohio
Organizations established in 1970
Bay Village, Ohio